Jessica Leigh Alexander (born November 18, 1976) is an American country music artist and songwriter.

Biography
She has had her songs recorded by Patty Loveless, Trisha Yearwood and Little Big Town. She also launched her own recording career in 2004. Two of her songs charted on Billboard's Hot Country Songs chart, and Columbia Records released her debut album, Honeysuckle Sweet, on March 1, 2005.

In 2006, she was dropped from the label, shortly after marrying Jon Randall.

Alexander co-wrote Miley Cyrus' single "The Climb", for the 2009 film Hannah Montana: The Movie and the Hannah Montana song "I'll Always Remember You" from the Hannah Montana Forever soundtrack. She also co-wrote Lee Brice's 2012 single "I Drive Your Truck", and Blake Shelton's "Drink on It", "Mine Would Be You" and "Turnin' Me On".

In 2021, Jessi was featured on "That Was Us" from the album 'Behind the Bar' by Riley Green.

Discography

Albums

Singles

Other Charting Songs

Music videos

Singles written by Alexander

Awards and nominations

References

1976 births
Living people
People from Jackson, Tennessee
American women country singers
American country singer-songwriters
Country musicians from Tennessee
Columbia Records artists
Singer-songwriters from Tennessee
21st-century American women singers
21st-century American singers
Canadian Country Music Association Songwriter(s) of the Year winners